Siret is a town in Suceava County, Romania.

Siret may also refer to:

 Siret (river), in Romania and Ukraine
 Siret (surname)
 SIRET code, a French code identifying the location of businesses
 Siret Kotka, Estonian politician

See also